Randy Elliot Bennett is an American educational researcher who specializes in educational assessment. He is currently the Norman O. Frederiksen Chair in Assessment Innovation at Educational Testing Service in Princeton, NJ. His research and writing focus on bringing together advances in cognitive science, technology, and measurement to improve teaching and learning. He received the ETS Senior Scientist Award in 1996, the ETS Career Achievement Award in 2005, the Teachers College, Columbia University Distinguished Alumni Award in 2016, Fellow status in the American Educational Research Association (AERA) in 2017, the National Council on Measurement in Education's (NCME) Bradley Hanson Award for Contributions to Educational Measurement in 2019 (with H. Guo, M. Zhang, and P. Deane), the E. F. Lindquist Award from AERA and ACT in 2020, and elected membership in the National Academy of Education in 2022. Randy Bennett was elected President of both the International Association for Educational Assessment (IAEA), a worldwide organization primarily constituted of governmental and NGO measurement organizations, and the National Council on Measurement in Education (NCME), whose members are employed in universities, testing organizations, state and federal education departments, and school districts.

Publications
Bennett is author or editor of nine books, as well as over 100 journal articles, chapters, and technical reports. Those publications have concentrated on several themes. The 1998 publication, Reinventing Assessment: Speculations on the Future of Large-Scale Educational Testing, presented a three-stage framework for how paper-and-pencil tests would gradually transition to digital form, eventually melding with online activities, blurring the distinction between learning and assessment, and leading to improvements in both pursuits. A series of subsequent publications built upon the work of Robert Glaser, Norman O. Frederiksen, Samuel Messick, James Pellegrino, Lorrie Shepard and others to create a unified model for formative and summative assessments under the Cognitively Based Assessment of, for, and as Learning (CBAL) initiative. This work, noted in the citations for both the E.F. Lindquist Award and his AERA Fellow designation,  is described in two journal articles, Transforming K-12 Assessment and Cognitively Based Assessment of, for, and as Learning. The latter publication articulated assumptions for the CBAL assessment model in a detailed "theory of action," which described the assessment system components, intended outcomes, and the action mechanisms that should lead to those outcomes, predating the generally recommended use of that device in operational testing programs. 

The journal article, Formative Assessment: A Critical Review, questioned the magnitude of efficacy claims, the meaningfulness of existing definitions, and the general absence of disciplinary considerations in the conceptualization and implementation of formative assessment. The article encouraged a deeper examination of premises, more careful consideration of effectiveness claims, and a move toward incorporating domain considerations directly into the structure and practice of formative assessment. 

Two reports--Online Assessment in Mathematics and Writing and Problem Solving in Technology Rich Environments--documented studies that helped set the stage for moving the US National Assessment of Educational Progress from paper presentation to computer delivery. 

Several recent articles called attention to the need for testing companies and state education departments to exercise caution in using artificial intelligence (AI) methods for scoring consequential tests. That theme was developed in a book chapter, Validity and Automated Scoring, and summarized in The Changing Nature of Educational Assessment. These publications note that in automated essay scoring, for example, caution is needed because of the inscrutability of some AI scoring methods, their use of correlates that can be easily manipulated for undeserved score gain, and the routine practice of building scoring algorithms to model the judgment of operational human graders, thereby unintentionally incorporating human biases.

Bennett's latest work centers on equity in assessment. The commentary, The Good Side of COVID-19, makes the case that standardized testing, and educational assessment more generally, must be rethought so that they better align with the multicultural, pluralistic society the US is rapidly becoming.

Books
Andrade, H. L., Bennett, R. E., & Cizek, G. J. (Eds.). (2019). Handbook of formative assessment in the disciplines. New York: Routledge.

Bennett, R. E., & von Davier, M. (Eds.). (2017). Advancing human assessment: The methodological, psychological, and policy contributions of ETS. Cham, Switzerland: Springer Open.

Bennett, R. E., & Ward, W. C.  (Eds.).  (1993).  Construction vs. choice in cognitive measurement: Issues in constructed response, performance testing, and portfolio assessment.  Hillsdale, NJ: Lawrence Erlbaum Associates.  

Willingham, W. W., Ragosta, M., Bennett, R. E., Braun, H. I. Rock, D. A., & Powers, D. E.  (1988).  Testing handicapped people.  Boston, MA: Allyn & Bacon.

Bennett, R. E.  (Ed.).  (1987).  Planning and evaluating computer education programs.  Columbus, OH: Merrill.

Bennett, R. E., & Maher, C. A. (Eds).  (1986).  Emerging perspectives in the assessment of exceptional children.  New York: Haworth Press.  

Cline, H. F., Bennett, R. E., Kershaw, R. C., Schneiderman, M. B., Stecher, B., & Wilson, S.  (1986).  The electronic schoolhouse: The IBM secondary school computer education program.  Hillsdale, NJ: Lawrence Erlbaum Associates.

Bennett, R. E., & Maher, C. A. (Eds.).  (1984).  Microcomputers and exceptional children.  New York: Haworth Press.    

Maher, C. A., & Bennett, R. E.  (1984).  Planning and evaluating special education services.  Englewood Cliffs, NJ: Prentice-Hall.

References

External links 
.

Year of birth missing (living people)
Living people
American educators
Teachers College, Columbia University alumni
Stony Brook University alumni
Erasmus Hall High School alumni
People from Brooklyn
American education writers